Prairieton may refer to a place in the United States:

Prairieton, Indiana
Prairieton Township, Christian County, Illinois